The MG Road is a Delhi Metro station located in Gurgaon, Haryana. The station lies on the Yellow Line of the Delhi Metro.

The station has two malls – DLF City Centre and MGF Metropolitan – on either side of it. It is also in the vicinity of residential complexes such as Beverley Park, Essel Towers and Heritage City.

History

Station layout

Facilities
List of available ATM at MG Road metro station are HDFC Bank, Yes Bank, State Bank of India, IndusInd Bank

Entry/Exit

Connections

Bus
Delhi Transport Corporation bus routes Badarpur Border - Gurugram Bus Stand, Ballabgarh Bus Stand - Rohtak ISBT, Gurugram Bus Stand - Badarpur Road, MG Road Metro Station - Green Field Colony Gate No 4/2, OLA152, OLA153, State Bank - Huda Office / Kendriya Vihar serves the station from outside metro station stop.

See also
Haryana
Gurgaon
List of Delhi Metro stations
Transport in Delhi
Delhi Metro Rail Corporation
Delhi Suburban Railway
Delhi Monorail
Delhi Transport Corporation
South East Delhi
New Delhi
National Capital Region (India)
List of rapid transit systems
List of metro systems

References

External links

 Delhi Metro Rail Corporation Ltd. (Official site) 
 Delhi Metro Annual Reports
 
 UrbanRail.Net – Descriptions of all metro systems in the world, each with a schematic map showing all stations.

Delhi Metro stations
Railway stations opened in 2010
Railway stations in Gurgaon district
2010 establishments in Delhi